Vernon Dunn (March 29, 1918 – April 2, 2002) was an American politician. He served as a Democratic member for the 51st district of the Oklahoma House of Representatives.

Life and career 
Dunn was born in Caddo, Oklahoma, the son of Nancy and Ed Dunn. He was a commissioner in Stephens County, Oklahoma.

In 1965, Dunn was elected to the 51st district of the Oklahoma House of Representatives. He served until 1983, when he was succeeded by Bill Smith.

Dunn died in April 2002 from complications of pneumonia, at the age of 84.

References 

1918 births
2002 deaths
Democratic Party members of the Oklahoma House of Representatives
20th-century American politicians
20th-century Members of the Oklahoma House of Representatives
Deaths from pneumonia
People from Bryan County, Oklahoma